Kristens Krīgers (born 25 August 1996) is a Latvian male BMX rider, representing his nation at international competitions. He competed in the time trial event at the 2015 UCI BMX World Championships.

References

External links
 
 

1996 births
Living people
BMX riders
Latvian male cyclists
European Games competitors for Latvia
Cyclists at the 2015 European Games
Place of birth missing (living people)